Yohan Mendis (born 19 January 1997) is a Sri Lankan cricketer. He made his List A debut for Tamil Union Cricket and Athletic Club in the 2018–19 Premier Limited Overs Tournament on 12 March 2019. He made his Twenty20 debut on 12 January 2020, for Tamil Union Cricket and Athletic Club in the 2019–20 SLC Twenty20 Tournament.

References

External links
 

1997 births
Living people
Sri Lankan cricketers
Tamil Union Cricket and Athletic Club cricketers
Place of birth missing (living people)